is a passenger railway station located in the city of Kuwana, Mie Prefecture, Japan, operated by the private railway operator Sangi Railway.

Lines
Nishibessho Station is served by the Hokusei Line, and is located 2.0 kilometres from the terminus of the line at Nishi-Kuwana Station.

Layout
The station consists of a single side platform serving bi-directional traffic. The station is unattended.

Platforms

Adjacent stations

History
Nishibessho Station was opened on April 5, 1914 as a station on the Hokusei Railway, which became the Hokusei Electric Railway on June 27, 1934. On April 20, 1977, the platform was extended by an additional five meters. Through a series of mergers, the line became part of the Kintetsu network by April 1, 1965, but was spun out as an independent company on April 1, 2003. A new station building was completed on March 25, 2004.

Passenger statistics
In fiscal 2019, the station was used by an average of 166 passengers daily (boarding passengers only).

Surrounding area
Kuwana Nishibessho Post Office

See also
List of railway stations in Japan

References

External links

Sangi Railway official home page

Railway stations in Japan opened in 1914
Railway stations in Mie Prefecture
Kuwana, Mie